Benedetto Ghirlandaio (1458–1497) was an Italian (Florentine) painter.  His brothers Davide Ghirlandaio (1452–1525) and Domenico Ghirlandaio (1449–1494) were both painters, as was his nephew Ridolfo Ghirlandaio (1483–1561). From 1486 until 1493 he was active in France, where survives his only extant signed painting, an altarpiece of the Nativity at Nôtre-Dame in Aigueperse (Puy-de-Dôme, Auvergne). Benedetto died in Florence on 17 July 1497.

References 

 Thieme, Ulrich and Felix Becker, Allgemeines Lexikon der bildenden Künstler von der Antike bis zur Gegenwart, Reprint of 1907 edition, Leipzig, Veb E.A. Seemann Verlag, 1980-1986.
 Vasari, Giorgio, Le Vite delle più eccellenti pittori, scultori, ed architettori, many editions and translations.

1458 births
1497 deaths
15th-century Italian painters
Italian male painters
Painters from Florence
Italian Renaissance painters